Dobie Center, named after J. Frank Dobie, is a formerly privately-owned 27-story residence hall located on the University of Texas at Austin campus.  On October 12, 2021, the University of Texas announced it was purchasing the center to provide additional school-owned housing near campus for its students. In addition to being a residence for students, Dobie also contains a two-story mall, restaurants, and specialty stores.
 The property features a pool, fitness center, two sport courts, six elevators, and an industrial-styled cafeteria.

History

The building was designed by J. & G. Daverman and Associates in 1972. Upon its completion, Dobie Center was the tallest building in Austin, surpassing the Texas State Capitol, which had held the title for nearly 90 years. Dobie was the first modernist building to exist on UT's campus.

The building underwent a US$10 million facelift in 1990 to replace its then brick façade by exposing the glass underneath. When classes began in the Fall 1989 semester, would-be residents of Dobie Center were temporarily relocated to the Radisson Plaza Hotel.

On November 11, 2006, a fire, started by an improperly extinguished cigarette, broke out on the pool deck of Dobie Center causing an estimated $600,000 worth of damage. The pool deck reopened in late April 2008.  The fire was contained to an area outside of the residential tower.  This structure was an old wooden deck that has been replaced by a concrete structure.

The Dobie Mall was completely remodeled by the Nix Group in the '90s and is now a hub of student activity and shopping . The mall is a two-story shopping and food center featuring a food court, stores, and even a chapel. The food court today features seating for 500 and various assorted independently run food outlets.

In 2014 the Dobie Center became managed by Campus Evolution Villages, marking the start of over $4 million in renovations, including new hardwood floors, a cafeteria face-lift, and an updated movie and game room. However, there was controversy during this time due to allegations made by many students that Campus Evolution Villages did not uphold their end of a bargain. .

In October 2021, the University of Texas at Austin purchased Dobie Center

Life at Dobie
The Dobie Center offers monthly resident events ranging from floor events to dorm-wide events, such as book club.

Additionally, The University of Texas's campus and covered parking garage are draws for students looking for convenience. Dobie had been historically known for having recurring elevator problems, with many students having been trapped in elevators for multiple hours; however, management recently took a major crack on the problem by replacing one of its three decade-old elevators.

There is a resident assistant on every few floors at Dobie. Dobie is also known for being able to accommodate international exchange students who are looking for a short-term stay due to its low occupancy rate.

Notable people

Michael Dell, founder of Dell, lived in room 2713 of Dobie Center.

2016 presidential candidate and former governor of Florida Jeb Bush lived in Dobie Center.

Daniel Johnston, outsider singer-songwriter and artist, worked at a now-closed McDonalds in Dobie Mall, located in Dobie Center. He would, reportedly, hand out tapes of his album Hi, How Are You to people while working.

Stores and restaurants
Some of the stores and restaurants inside Dobie Center include:
Emiliano's Burrito Factory
Dobie Market
The Princeton Review
Niki's Pizza
Oma's Kitchen
Army Recruiting Office
Navy Recruiting Office
U.S. Marine Corps Officer Selection Office
Regus
Subway
Target

References

External links

Map: 
Dobie Center
Landmark's Dobie Theater

University of Texas at Austin campus
University and college dormitories in the United States
Shopping malls in Austin, Texas
Residential skyscrapers in Austin, Texas
University and college buildings completed in 1972
1972 establishments in Texas